The 2013 New England Revolution season was the team's eighteenth year of existence, all in Major League Soccer. The team also participated in the Desert Diamond Cup and U.S. Open Cup. The season began with a 1-0 win at the Chicago Fire on March 9 and concluded with a 1-0 win at Columbus Crew on October 27. That victory saw the Revolution make the playoffs for the first time since the 2009 season. The team lost 4-3 on aggregate to eventual champions Sporting Kansas City in the Conference Semifinals of the 2013 MLS Cup Playoffs.

Squad

Roster

Out on loan

Coaching Staff and Executives

Facilities

Player movement

Transfers

In

Out

Squad statistics

Individual 

{{Extended football squad player|no=23|name=José Gonçalves (on loan from Sion)|pos=DF|nat=POR|34+0|2|1+0|0|2+0|0}}

Italic: denotes player is no longer with team

 Top scorers 
Includes all competitive matches. The list is sorted by shirt number when total goals are equal.

{| class="wikitable" style="font-size: 95%; text-align: center;"
|-
!width=15 style="background:navy; color:white; text-align:center;"|
!width=15 style="background:navy; color:white; text-align:center;"|
!width=15 style="background:navy; color:white; text-align:center;"|
!width=15 style="background:navy; color:white; text-align:center;"|
!width=226 style="background:navy; color:white; text-align:center;"|Name
!width=130 style="background:navy; color:white; text-align:center;"|Major League Soccer
!width=90 style="background:navy; color:white; text-align:center;"|U.S. Open Cup
!width=80 style="background:navy; color:white; text-align:center;"|Total
|-
|rowspan=1|1
|14
|FW
|
|Diego Fagundez
|5
|0
|5
|-
|rowspan=1|2
|11
|MF
|
|Kelyn Rowe
|1
|2
|3
|-
|rowspan=4|3
|9
|FW
|
|Chad Barrett
|1
|1
|2
|-
|10
|FW
|
|Juan Agudelo
|2
|0
|2
|-
|24
|MF
|
|Lee Nguyen
|2
|0
|2
|-
|27
|FW
|
|Jerry Bengtson
|1
|1
|2
|-
|rowspan=3|4
|12
|MF
|
|Andy Dorman
|0
|1
|1
|-
|13
|MF
|
|Ryan Guy
|1
|0
|1
|-
|39
|FW
|
|Saër Sène
|1
|0
|1
|-
|colspan="4"|
! style="background:red; color:white; text-align:center;"|TOTALS
! style="background:red; color:white; text-align:center;"|14
! style="background:red; color:white; text-align:center;"|5
! style="background:red; color:white; text-align:center;"|19

Italic: denotes no longer with club.

 Top assists 
Includes all competitive matches. The list is sorted by shirt number when total goals are equal.

{| class="wikitable" style="font-size: 95%; text-align: center;"
|-
!width=15 style="background:navy; color:white; text-align:center;"|
!width=15 style="background:navy; color:white; text-align:center;"|
!width=15 style="background:navy; color:white; text-align:center;"|
!width=15 style="background:navy; color:white; text-align:center;"|
!width=226 style="background:navy; color:white; text-align:center;"|Name
!width=130 style="background:navy; color:white; text-align:center;"|Major League Soccer
!width=90 style="background:navy; color:white; text-align:center;"|U.S. Open Cup
!width=80 style="background:navy; color:white; text-align:center;"|Total
|-
|rowspan=1|1
|11
|MF
|
|Kelyn Rowe
|5
|1
|6
|-
|rowspan=3|2
|8
|DF
|
|Chris Tierney
|2
|0
|2
|-
|9
|FW
|
|Chad Barrett
|1
|1
|2
|-
|14
|FW
|
|Diego Fagundez
|2
|0
|2
|-
|rowspan=5|3
|2
|DF
|
|Andrew Farrell
|1
|0
|1
|-
|19
|MF
|
|Clyde Simms
|1
|0
|1
|-
|24
|MF
|
|Lee Nguyen
|1
|0
|1
|-
|25
|DF
|
|Darrius Barnes
|0
|1
|1
|-
|39
|FW
|
|Saër Sène
|1
|0
|1
|-
|colspan="4"|
! style="background:red; color:white; text-align:center;"|TOTALS
! style="background:red; color:white; text-align:center;"|14
! style="background:red; color:white; text-align:center;"|3
! style="background:red; color:white; text-align:center;"|17

Italic: denotes no longer with club.

 Top Shutouts
Includes all competitive matches. The list is sorted by shirt number when total goals are equal.

{| class="wikitable" style="font-size: 95%; text-align: center;"
|-
!width=15 style="background:navy; color:white; text-align:center;"|
!width=15 style="background:navy; color:white; text-align:center;"|
!width=15 style="background:navy; color:white; text-align:center;"|
!width=15 style="background:navy; color:white; text-align:center;"|
!width=226 style="background:navy; color:white; text-align:center;"|Name
!width=130 style="background:navy; color:white; text-align:center;"|Major League Soccer
!width=90 style="background:navy; color:white; text-align:center;"|U.S. Open Cup
!width=80 style="background:navy; color:white; text-align:center;"|Total
|-
|rowspan=1|1
|22
|GK
|
|Bobby Shuttleworth
|7
|0
|7
|-
|rowspan=1|2
|1
|GK
|
|Matt Reis
|2
|0
|2
|-
|rowspan=1|3
|36
|GK
|
|Luis Soffner
|0
|0
|0
|-
|colspan="4"|
! style="background:red; color:white; text-align:center;"|TOTALS
! style="background:red; color:white; text-align:center;"|9
! style="background:red; color:white; text-align:center;"|0
! style="background:red; color:white; text-align:center;"|9

Italic: denotes no longer with club.

 Competitions 

 Preseason 

 Desert Diamond Cup 

 Standings 

 Matches 

 Major League Soccer 

Kickoff times are in EDT.

 Standings 

 Eastern Conference 

 Overall table 
Note: the table below has no impact on playoff qualification and is used solely for determining host of the MLS Cup, certain CCL spots, and 2014 MLS draft. The conference tables are the sole determinant for teams qualifying to the playoffs

 Results summary 

 Results by round 

 Matches 

MLS Cup Playoffs

Bracket

Results

Conference semifinalsSporting Kansas City won 4-3 on aggregate''

U.S. Open Cup

Miscellany

Allocation ranking 
New England is in the #5 position in the MLS Allocation Ranking. The allocation ranking is the mechanism used to determine which MLS club has first priority to acquire a U.S. National Team player who signs with MLS after playing abroad, or a former MLS player who returns to the league after having gone to a club abroad for a transfer fee. A ranking can be traded, provided that part of the compensation received in return is another club's ranking.

International roster spots 
New England has 8 MLS International Roster Slots for use in the 2013 season. Each club in Major League Soccer is allocated 8 international roster spots and no New England trades have been reported.

Notes 

New England Revolution seasons
New England Revolution
New England Revolution
New England Revolution
Sports competitions in Foxborough, Massachusetts